Robert Taft Sr. (1725) was the first Taft in the United States and the founder of the American Taft family.

Early history
Robert Taft Sr. was first known to be in Massachusetts in 1675 (or 1678) in Braintree. Another reference listed him from 1669 at Mendon. He lived in Braintree from around 1675 to 1680 before moving to Mendon, following King Philip's War. Several of Robert Taft I's children were born at Braintree. The first settlers in Massachusetts were killed at Mendon during the uprising of Native Americans. The Taft family in America developed its roots in Mendon and Uxbridge beginning with Robert Taft Sr. and his wife Sarah (née Simpson). Several of their children were born at Braintree. Robert and Sarah had five children. These are the children born to Robert and Sarah with dates of birth and known locations of their births: Thomas Taft, born 1671, at Mendon, Mass., married Deborah Genery; Robert Taft, born 1674 at Braintree, Mass., married Elizabeth Woodard; Daniel Taft, born 1677 at Braintree, Mass., married Hannah (maiden name unknown) and Lydia Chapin; Joseph Taft, born 1680 at Mendon, Mass., married Elizabeth Emerson; Benjamin Taft, born 31 March 1684 at Bristol, Mass., married Sarah Thomas and Barsheba Dicke.

First American Taft homestead
The original American Taft homestead was in the part of Mendon which later became Uxbridge. Robert Taft I bought the deed to the land in 1679. The previous landowner, one Colonel Crown, reportedly left the area during King Philip's War, and did not return.  The home on the land at "Mendham", (old English spelling of Mendon) at present day Uxbridge, was built by Robert Taft Sr., the first immigrant, in 1680. His son, also called Robert Taft Jr., born 1674, was among the first Uxbridge Board of Selectmen in 1727.

Life and work
One reference in Alphonso Taft's bio indicates that Robert settled near "Colonel Crown's" land which may be near East Hartford Avenue, in present-day Uxbridge. Taft and his sons were farmers in rural western Mendon, which later incorporated as Uxbridge shortly after Robert Taft I died. The Seagrave family evidently also played a role in the early work done by the Tafts, and may have been indentured servants of the Tafts. Taft was best known for building a bridge with his sons over the Blackstone River in 1709. This original bridge was likely near or at the location of the famous "stone arch bridge" at the Blackstone River and Canal Heritage State Park. This road became known as the Middle Post Road and later carried French and Indian War troops, Revolutionary War troops, and supplies in the War of 1812.

Famous descendants
Robert Taft's descendants are a large politically active family with descendants who are prominent in Ohio, but live throughout the United States. A descendant of Robert Taft Sr., William Howard Taft, became the President of the United States, and Chief Justice of the U.S. Supreme Court. Robert Taft Sr.'s grandson Josiah Taft died prematurely, at the age of 47, and his widow, Lydia Taft, became America's First Woman Voter in 1756. Another descendant of Taft was Ezra Taft Benson who was United States Secretary of Agriculture before being called to the Quorum of the Twelve Apostles of The Church of Jesus Christ of Latter-day Saints and, ultimately, the President of the church until his death.

Death and place
Taft died at the age of 85 in the western part of Mendon, Suffolk County, Massachusetts, on February 8, 1725, two years before the place he lived became the newly incorporated town of Uxbridge.

References

American people of English descent
American people of Scotch-Irish descent
Taft family
1640 births
1725 deaths
People from Braintree, Massachusetts
People from Mendon, Massachusetts
People from Uxbridge, Massachusetts